Lacida costalis is a moth of the family Erebidae first described by Francis Walker in 1855. It is found in Sri Lanka.

Adult has greyish, deeply rounded forewings with angled fasciae and black marginal spots. These spots are irregular in size.

References

Moths of Asia
Moths described in 1855